Sir Beville Stanier, 1st Baronet (12 June 1867 – 15 December 1921) was a British politician and landowner.

Stanier was born in Ambleside, Lancashire in 1867, the son of Francis Stanier and Caroline Stanier, sister of General William Clive Justice (1835–1908). He was educated privately then studied at the Royal Agricultural College in Cirencester, and in 1894 married Constance Gibbons, daughter of the Reverend Benjamin Gibbons. They had four children, including Alexander Stanier, a prominent Army officer. Stanier farmed a 4,000 hectare estate at Peplow Hall, which had been purchased by his father in the 1870s.

He entered public life in 1902, as a member of Shropshire County Council, holding this post until 1912. Following the death of the incumbent William Kenyon-Slaney, Stanier was elected as a Unionist Member of Parliament for Newport, Shropshire in a 1908 by-election. He held the seat until the 1918 general election, when at same time the Newport constituency was abolished and he replaced the retiring Rowland Hunt in Ludlow. He remained the MP for Ludlow until his death, aged 54, in 1921. He was created a baronet in the 1917 Birthday Honours.

During the First World War, Stanier held the rank of captain in the Territorial Reserve, and served as the honorary secretary of the Shropshire Territorial Association, the body that administered military units raised in the county. At the start of the war in 1914, he took on the annual post of treasurer of the Royal Salop Infirmary in Shrewsbury when their preferred candidate had been mobilized to serve abroad.

Stanier was the deputy chairman of the North Staffordshire Railway and the Trent and Mersey Canal, a director of the Farmers' Land Purchase Company and Home Grown Sugar. He was also chair of the British Sugar Beet Growers' Society and a governor of Harper Adams Agricultural College, and until a few years before his death was proprietor of the Shrewsbury Chronicle.

References

External links
 

1867 births
1921 deaths
Alumni of the Royal Agricultural University
UK MPs 1906–1910
UK MPs 1910
UK MPs 1910–1918
UK MPs 1918–1922
Baronets in the Baronetage of the United Kingdom
Conservative Party (UK) MPs for English constituencies
British Army officers
British Army personnel of World War I
Military personnel from Lancashire